Jason Watkins (born July 10, 1985) is a former American football offensive tackle. He was signed by the Houston Texans as an undrafted free agent in 2009. He played college football at Florida.

Watkins was also a member of the New York Sentinels and Buffalo Bills.

Early years
Watkins was born in New Orleans, Louisiana.  He attended Lake Gibson High School in Lakeland, Florida as a junior and senior, playing football only two years and earning Class 4A all-state, all-county and all-conference first-team accolades as a senior. He participated in the 2003 Cali-Florida Bowl.

College career
Watkins received an athletic scholarship to attend the University of Florida in Gainesville, Florida, where he played for coach Urban Meyer's Florida Gators football team from 2005 to 2008.  Watkins helped the Gators win two National Championships (2006 and 2008) as member of the offensive line that paved the way for Heisman Trophy-winning quarterback Tim Tebow.

In his senior season, Watkins was named honorable mention All-Southeastern Conference by the Associated Press, as he produced 78 knockdowns to go with 12 touchdown-resulting blocks. He graded 81.71% and was part of a front wall that gave up just 16 sacks. The Gators went on to capture the national title behind an offense that averaged 445.07 yards and 43.64 points per game

Professional career

Pre-draft

Houston Texans
Watkins was signed on April 28, 2009 by the Houston Texans after going undrafted in the 2009 NFL Draft. He was waived on September 5.

New York Sentinels
Watkins played for the New York Sentinels of the United Football League in 2009.

Buffalo Bills
After playing in the UFL, Watkins was signed to the Buffalo Bills' practice squad on November 24. After his contract expired following the season, he was re-signed to a future contract on January 5, 2010.

References

Bibliography
Carlson, Norm, University of Florida Football Vault: The History of the Florida Gators, Whitman Publishing, LLC, Atlanta, Georgia (2007).  .

External links
Buffalo Bills bio
Florida Gators bio
Just Sports Stats

1985 births
Living people
Players of American football from New Orleans
American football offensive tackles
Florida Gators football players
Houston Texans players
New York Sentinels players
Buffalo Bills players